Mick Hubert (born February 16, 1954) is a retired radio play-by-play announcer who from 1989 to 2022 served as the primary radio voice and media host for the Florida Gators sports programs at the University of Florida (UF). He was well known for his exuberant announcing style, highlighted by his use of the phrase "Oh my!" when excited by the action on the field.

Early life and career 
Hubert was born in St. Anne, Illinois and got his first broadcast experience calling high school football games on WMDB-AM in Peoria while a student at Illinois State University. He graduated with a degree in broadcast journalism in 1976, and in 1979, he became the sports director at WHIO-TV in Dayton, Ohio. During his 10 years at the station, he did radio and television play-by-play for Bradley University and University of Dayton athletic events, along with play-by-play for NCAA tournament games on ESPN.

Voice of the Gators 
Hubert became only the third radio "Voice of the Gators" in 1989. (Original UF radio play-by-play announcer Otis Boggs held the position for over four decades, and successor David Steele left in 1989 to become the TV voice of the expansion Orlando Magic of the National Basketball Association.) Beginning with the 1989 football season, Hubert was the lead radio announcer for Florida's football and men's basketball teams, along with most baseball broadcasts. In addition, he served as host for Gator coaches' radio and television shows and hosted and produced the majority of the television, radio, and online content created by UF's athletic department. On football broadcasts, he worked alongside several color analysts over the years, including former Gator players James Jones, Lee McGriff, and Shane Matthews. For basketball, he called the action with Mark Wise, Bill Koss, or Lee Humphrey.

"Doering's got a touchdown!" 
Hubert was known at Florida for his extensive preparation, his coining of nicknames for Gator players, and "passionate" announcing style. He first came to prominence after the Gators' last-minute win at Kentucky on September 11, 1993. His energetic yelling of "DOERING'S GOT A TOUCHDOWN! DOERING'S GOT A TOUCHDOWN! OHHHH MY!" in describing the game-winning touchdown pass from Danny Wuerffel to Chris Doering was extensively replayed on national sports networks and became so well known that it was featured in the ESPN films SEC Storied documentary "More than a Voice" almost thirty years later. Over the ensuing decades, his enthusiastic radio calls (including his use of "Oh my!", which he attributed to the influence of long-time sportscaster Dick Enberg) were often used by national sports media when featuring highlights of Gator games.

Retirement 
In May 2022, Hubert announced that he was retiring after 33 years at UF to spend more time with his family. His last call as "Voice of the Gators" was during the Florida baseball team's final regular season series against South Carolina in May 2022 in which Hubert served as play-by-play announcer for the SEC Network's television coverage.

Awards and recognitions 
Hubert received many accolades during his long career, beginning with two Emmy Awards for sports coverage while working at WHIO in the early 1980s. More recently, he was named the National Sports Media Association's Florida Sportscaster of the Year in 2017 and was inducted into the Florida Sports Hall of Fame in 2018.  As the radio voice of the Gators, Hubert called Florida's 1996, 2006, and 2008 football national championships, the 2006 and 2007 men's basketball championships, and the 2017 NCAA baseball championships, making him the only radio announcer to ever call championships for all three major sports for the same university.

References

1954 births
Living people
College football announcers
College basketball announcers in the United States
College baseball announcers in the United States
Florida Gators baseball announcers
Florida Gators men's basketball announcers
Florida Gators football announcers
Illinois State University alumni
Sportspeople from Dayton, Ohio
People from Kankakee County, Illinois
People from Gainesville, Florida